Jacques Fatton (19 December 1925 – 26 July 2011) was a Swiss footballer.

Career
Fatton, who was born in Exincourt, France, was capped 53 times and scored 28 goals for the Switzerland national football team. He played in two FIFA World Cups, scoring twice in 1950 and once in 1954.

During his club career, Fatton played for Servette FC and Olympique Lyonnais.  He died in Geneva, Switzerland.

References

External links

1925 births
2011 deaths
Swiss men's footballers
Switzerland international footballers
1950 FIFA World Cup players
1954 FIFA World Cup players
Servette FC players
Olympique Lyonnais players
Ligue 1 players
Swiss-French people
Sportspeople from Doubs
Swiss Super League players
Association football forwards
Footballers from Bourgogne-Franche-Comté